A midnight mission by combined U.S. and Iraqi army forces resulted in 12 men being detained for questioning on suspicion of terrorist activity.

Operation Details
Soldiers of 4th Battalion, 31st Infantry Regiment, 2nd Brigade Combat Team, 10th Mountain Division (Light Infantry) out of Fort Drum, N.Y., and 4th Battalion, 4th Brigade, 6th Iraqi Army Division, joined forces to clear the villages near al-Owesat and al-Thobat, Iraq, 14 July 2007.

During Polar Tempest, tipsters gave the Coalition Forces viable information.

The night began with Soldiers clearing houses, when an Iraqi man who claimed to know where several terrorists lived in the area led them to various places.

As the patrol moved along, the Soldiers encountered small-arms fire and shot back, killing a terrorist. Three men fled, but Soldiers seized an AK-47 and an ammunition vest.

The Iraqi man guiding the Soldiers said he believed they had encountered the lead element of a larger group of insurgents. As the Coalition Forces and IA forces continued clearing houses in the area, the man pointed out one of the residents as a terrorist.

In another house a male claimed to know where a high-value target lived. As Coalition Forces followed him, several local residents began to flee in vehicles. They were stopped and detained.

As troops searched the areas near the Euphrates River, they came across two small boats at a water-pumping station. The Soldiers destroyed the boats. They also found an improvised explosive device, which was disarmed and thrown into the river.

Twelve detainees were taken to Coalition bases for further questioning.

During the searches, Soldiers also found a Dragunov sniper rifle magazine, a grenade, and an unidentified rifle.

Participating Units

American Units
4th Battalion, 31st Infantry Regiment, 2nd Brigade Combat Team, 10th Mountain Division (Light Infantry)

Iraqi Units
4th Battalion, 4th Brigade, 6th Iraqi Army Division

See also

War related Articles
Iraq War

Iraq Related Articles
Iraq
History of Iraq

Terrorism, Bombings and Insurgency Related
Terrorism
Iraq insurgency
List of bombings during the Iraq War

Casualties
United States military casualties of war
Post-traumatic stress disorder
Iraq Body Count project
Violence against academics in post-invasion Iraq

References

Polar Tempest

Military operations of the Iraq War involving the United States
Military operations of the Iraq War involving Iraq
Military operations of the Iraq War in 2007
Iraqi insurgency (2003–2011)